Bulk confectionery is supplied in a container with loose confectionery to be dispensed by weight or quantity, or containing a number of retail-size bags of confectionery, typically used in vending machines. Unbagged bulk confectionery is typically sold by confectionery retailers; the quantity required is weighed or counted out. Different types of confectionery at the same price per unit weight are sometimes dispensed mixed ("pick and mix").

In the United States, some of these confections are called penny candy and are sold by the piece in candy, soda fountain, and five and dime stores. In Britain, this type of candy is also referred to as pick 'n' mix or penny sweets. 

In Sweden, bulk confectionery ("Lösgodis") can be found in many stores, picked by hand. It usually often costs the equivalent of US$7,8 – $10 per kilogram. 

Loose candy is typically sold at kiosks, grocery stores and candy stores in the way that the customer picks up whatever kind, and how much, of candy they want (typically with a scoop) into a bag by themselves. The price of the candy depends on its weight, and the weighing can be either done by the customer or the seller.

History 
Bulk confectionery (Swedish Lösgodis) originates back to the 1930s, when Swedish agriculture began to supply the country with refined sugar and made it possible to sell bulk confectionery in smaller shops. In 1984, the Swedish National Food Agency (Livsmedelsverket) approved selling it in ordinary larger stores, given that the candy varieties were kept in separate containers and picked with a scoop or a smaller bucket.

Since then it has started to spread all around the world, mostly in Europe and Asia. Even some IKEA stores in North America have started to sell mostly Swedish varieties but also American classics.

Examples 

 Apple drops
 Bit-O-Honey
 Bottle caps
 Bubble gum (e.g. Bazooka)
 Peppermint sticks
 Candy corn
 Caramels
 Atomic Fireballs
 Fruit sours
 Gobstoppers
 Gummy bears
 Various gummis
 Hot Tamales
 Jelly beans
 Ropes of licorice
 Lollipops (suckers)
 M&M's
 Mary Janes
 Mentos
 Mints
 Pixy Stix
 Red Hots
 Sherbet
 Skittles
 Smarties
 Sour balls
 Sugar Daddy
 Tic Tacs
 Tootsie Rolls
 Warheads
 Wax candy

Swedish

 Colaflaskor
 Pastellfiskar
Blå fiskar
 Zoo
 Geléhallon
 Sockrade jordgubbar 
 Körsbär 
 Karamelguf
 Revolver frukt 
 Persikor 
 Vattenmeloner 
 Fizzy pop
 Fizzy blue 
 Skumkantareller 
 Ahlgrens bilar
 Sockerbitar jordgubb 
 Snöbollar jordgubbar 
 Snöbollar blå hallon 
 Vaniljfudge 
 Engelsk konfekt
 Lakritspinnar 
 Djungelvrål 
 Romerska bågar 
 Plopp pralin
 Polly
 Jordnötsruta 
 Kexchoklad
 Plopp original 
 Kick original 
 PEZ
 Zoo-klubba 
 Pimpim-klubba
 Fruxo-klubba 
 Djungelvrål-klubba

Gallery

See also 
 Dagashi, cheap candies and snacks in Japan

References 

Confectionery